Dalsfjord or Dalsfjorden may refer to:

Dalsfjord, Møre og Romsdal, a former municipality in Møre og Romsdal county, Norway
Dalsfjord Church, a church in Volda Municipality in Møre og Romsdal county, Norway
Dalsfjorden (Luster), a fjord in Luster municipality in Sogn og Fjordane county, Norway
Dalsfjorden (Sunnfjord), a fjord in the Sunnfjord area of Sogn og Fjordane county, Norway
Dalsfjorden (Sunnmøre), a fjord in Volda municipality in Møre og Romsdal county, Norway